The Sentinel is an English daily newspaper launched in 1983 in the city of Guwahati, in the state of Assam, India. It has four editions published simultaneously from Guwahati, Dibrugarh, Shillong and Itanagar. The Sentinel caters to the entire North Eastern region of India.

History
It was first published in 1983 and senior journalist Dhirendra Nath Bezbaruah was selected as the founder editor. The newspaper was edited for a long time by Mr. Bezbaruah, who was also the former president of The Editors Guild of India. Former Assam DGP and  litterateur Harekrishna Deka and renowned journalist Gauri Shankar Kalita also were editors of this newspaper at some point of time. When The Sentinel was launched in 1983, all newspapers in the North East were printed on letterpress machines, but The Sentinel was the first daily newspaper in the North East that started off with a combination of phototypesetting and web offset printing. According to Audit Bureau of Circulation(ABC), The Sentinel in combination with its sister publications has the highest circulation in North East India making it the largest publishing house in the North East.

See also
 The Assam Tribune
 Dhirendra Nath Bezbaruah

External links

English-language newspapers published in India
Newspapers published in Assam
Publications with year of establishment missing
1983 establishments in Assam
Publications established in 1983